Orava or Orawa may refer to:
Orava (region), a region in Slovakia and Poland
Orava (river) in Slovakia
Orava Castle, a castle in Slovakia
Orava (reservoir), a reservoir in Slovakia
Orava County, a historic administrative county of the Kingdom of Hungary
Orava Parish, a rural municipality in southern Estonia
Orava, Estonia, a village in Orava Parish
Orava, Russia, an Estonian village in Novosibirsk Oblast, Russia
Oriava, a village in western Ukraine
Sakari Orava (born 1945), Finnish sports-medicine surgeon
Pikku Orava, a Finnish artist character that resembles the Chipmunks
Orawa, a classical music piece by Wojciech Kilar